The 2014–15 UEFA Champions League qualifying phase and play-off round were played from 1 July to 27 August 2014. A total of 55 teams competed in the qualifying phase and play-off round to decide 10 of the 32 places in the group stage of the 2014–15 UEFA Champions League.

All times were CEST (UTC+2).

Round and draw dates
All draws were held at UEFA headquarters in Nyon, Switzerland.

Format
In the qualifying phase and play-off round, each tie was played over two legs, with each team playing one leg at home. The team that scored more goals on aggregate over the two legs advanced to the next round. If the aggregate score was level, the away goals rule was applied, i.e. the team that scored more goals away from home over the two legs advanced. If away goals were also equal, then 30 minutes of extra time was played. The away goals rule was again applied after extra time, i.e. if there were goals scored during extra time and the aggregate score was still level, the visiting team advanced by virtue of more away goals scored. If no goals were scored during extra time, the tie was decided by penalty shoot-out.

In the draws for each round, teams were seeded based on their UEFA club coefficients at the beginning of the season, with the teams divided into seeded and unseeded pots. A seeded team was drawn against an unseeded team, with the order of legs in each tie decided randomly. Due to the limited time between matches, the draws for the second and third qualifying rounds took place before the results of the previous round were known. For these draws (or in any cases where the result of a tie in the previous round was not known at the time of the draw), the seeding was carried out under the assumption that the team with the higher coefficient of an undecided tie advanced to this round, which means if the team with the lower coefficient was to advance, it simply took the seeding of its defeated opponent. Prior to the draws, UEFA may form "groups" in accordance with the principles set by the Club Competitions Committee, but they were purely for convenience of the draw and for ensuring that teams from the same association were not drawn against each other, and did not resemble any real groupings in the sense of the competition.

Teams
There were two routes which the teams were separated into during qualifying:
Champions Route, which included all domestic champions which did not automatically qualify for the group stage.
League Route (also called the Non-champions Path or the Best-placed Path), which included all domestic non-champions which did not automatically qualify for the group stage.

A total of 55 teams (40 in Champions Route, 15 in League Route) were involved in the qualifying phase and play-off round. The 10 winners of the play-off round (5 in Champions Route, 5 in League Route) advanced to the group stage to join the 22 automatic qualifiers. The 15 losers of the third qualifying round entered the Europa League play-off round, and the 10 losers of the play-off round entered the Europa League group stage.

Below were the participating teams (with their 2014 UEFA club coefficients), grouped by their starting rounds.

Champions Route

League Route

First qualifying round

Seeding
A total of six teams played in the first qualifying round. The draw was held on 23 June 2014.

Summary
The first legs were played on 1 and 2 July, and the second legs were played on 8 July 2014.

|}

Matches

3–3 on aggregate; FC Santa Coloma won on away goals.

HB won 6–3 on aggregate.

Levadia Tallinn won 8–0 on aggregate.

Second qualifying round

Seeding
A total of 34 teams played in the second qualifying round: 31 teams which entered in this round, and the three winners of the first qualifying round. The draw was held on 23 June 2014.

Notes

Summary
The first legs were played on 15 and 16 July, and the second legs were played on 22 and 23 July 2014.

|}

Notes

Matches

1–1 on aggregate; BATE Borisov won on away goals.

Maccabi Tel Aviv won 3–0 on aggregate.

Aktobe won 4–0 on aggregate.

Maribor won 2–0 on aggregate.

Sheriff Tiraspol won 5–0 on aggregate.

Sparta Prague won 8–1 on aggregate.

Malmö won 1–0 on aggregate.

Slovan Bratislava won 3–0 on aggregate.

Celtic won 5–0 on aggregate.

Debrecen won 2–0 on aggregate.

Partizan won 6–1 on aggregate.

Legia Warsaw won 6–1 on aggregate.

HJK won 2–1 on aggregate.

Dinamo Zagreb won 4–0 on aggregate.

Ludogorets Razgrad won 5–1 on aggregate.

Qarabağ won 5–0 on aggregate.

Steaua București won 3–0 on aggregate.

Third qualifying round

Seeding
A total of 30 teams played in the third qualifying round:
Champions Route: three teams which entered in this round, and the 17 winners of the second qualifying round.
League Route: ten teams which entered in this round.
The draw was held on 18 July 2014.

Notes

Summary
The first legs were played on 29 and 30 July, and the second legs were played on 5 and 6 August 2014.

|+Champions Route

|}

|+League Route

|}

Notes

Matches

Red Bull Salzburg won 3–2 on aggregate.

BATE Borisov won 3–2 on aggregate.

Slovan Bratislava won 2–1 on aggregate.

AaB won 2–1 on aggregate.

4–4 on aggregate; Celtic won on away goals.
Second leg forfeited because of a clerical error by Legia Warsaw regarding Bartosz Bereszyński, who had been suspended for three UEFA club competition matches as a result of a red card on matchday 6 of the 2013–14 UEFA Europa League group stage against Apollon Limassol. Normally, he would have been suspended for the two legs against St. Patrick's Athletic and the first leg of the Celtic; however, Legia Warsaw failed to register Bereszyński for the St. Patrick's Athletic matches, meaning he would have had to sit out both legs of this match and the first leg of the next UEFA match. Bereszyński entered the second leg in the 86th minute as an illegal substitute because his suspension had not been legally served; Celtic were therefore awarded the second leg 3–0.

Steaua București won 4–3 on aggregate.

Maribor won 3–2 on aggregate.

APOEL won 4–2 on aggregate.

4–4 on aggregate; Malmö won on away goals.

2–2 on aggregate; Ludogorets Razgrad won on away goals.

Zenit Saint Petersburg won 3–1 on aggregate.

Copenhagen won 2–0 on aggregate.

Beşiktaş won 5–2 on aggregate.

Lille won 3–1 on aggregate.

Standard Liège won 2–1 on aggregate.

Notes

Play-off round

Seeding
A total of 20 teams played in the play-off round:
Champions Route: the ten Champions Route winners of the third qualifying round.
League Route: five teams which entered in this round, and the five League Route winners of the third qualifying round.
The draw was held on 8 August 2014.

Summary
The first legs were played on 19 and 20 August, and the second legs were played on 26 and 27 August 2014.

|+Champions Route

|}

|+League Route

|}

Matches

Maribor won 2–1 on aggregate.

Malmö won 4–2 on aggregate.

APOEL won 5–1 on aggregate.

1–1 on aggregate; Ludogorets Razgrad won on penalties.

BATE Borisov won 4–1 on aggregate.

Arsenal won 1–0 on aggregate.

Zenit Saint Petersburg won 4–0 on aggregate.

Bayer Leverkusen won 7–2 on aggregate.

Porto won 3–0 on aggregate.

Athletic Bilbao won 4–2 on aggregate.

Statistics
There were 212 goals in 90 matches in the qualifying phase and play-off round, for an average of 2.36 goals per match.

Top goalscorers

Top assists

Notes

References

External links
2014–15 UEFA Champions League

Qualifying Rounds
2014-15